A permit service is a company that specializes in obtaining transportation permits for the trucking industry, predominantly in the US and Canada. The two permits that may be required in lieu of IFTA Registration would be Trip and Fuel. A vehicle registered under IFTA does not need either permit as member jurisdictions work together to track, collect and share the taxes payable on motor fuels. A third permit is commonly required for oversize or overweight loads. There might also be specialty permits required for unusual circumstances. A permit service generally has an online portal which allows permits to be obtained within a few hours.

See also
Glossary of the American trucking industry
Road transport

References

Roads in the United States